John Melvin Gilman (September 7, 1824 – September 26, 1906) was an American politician and lawyer.

Born in Calais, Vermont, Gilman was admitted to the Vermont bar in 1846. He moved to New Lisbon, Ohio in 1846 and practiced law. He served in the Ohio House of Representatives in 1849 and 1850. In 1857, Gilman moved to Minnesota Territory and settled in Saint Paul. He continued to practice law. Gilman was the Democratic Party nominee for a U.S. House seat in 1859 and again in 1863, losing to William Windom and Ignatius Donnelly. Gilman served in the Minnesota House of Representatives in 1865, 1869, and 1877. Gilman died at a hospital in Saint Paul, Minnesota from a fall caused by a stroke at his home.

Family
Gilman was the son of Dr. John Taylor Gilman (1791-1825) and his wife Ruth Curtis (1799-1865). His mother remarried in 1829 to Nathaniel Eaton (1791-1878), who was later a Vermont state senator and a judge. Gilman's older brother Marcus (1820-1889) became a successful Chicago merchant; after returning to Vermont in 1871, he served in the Vermont General Assembly in 1874 and compiled a bibliography of Vermont history. He was an unsuccessful Democratic candidate for mayor of Chicago in 1859. One of Gilman's step-brothers was Dorman Bridgman Eaton (1823-1899), a lawyer prominent in civil service reform.

Gilman married Anna G. Cornwell in 1857. Their two oldest children, John (b. 1859) and Marcus (b. 1860) died in a boating accident on the Mississippi River in 1877. A third, Hays (1862-3) died in infancy. Jesse (1864-1944) married Lucius Pond Ordway (1862-1948), who became a prominent St. Paul businessman. Catherine "Kit", born 1868, married a man named James Potter Elmer.

Notes

External links

1824 births
1906 deaths
People from Calais, Vermont
People from Lisbon, Ohio
Politicians from Saint Paul, Minnesota
Minnesota lawyers
Ohio lawyers
Vermont lawyers
Democratic Party members of the Minnesota House of Representatives
Members of the Ohio House of Representatives
Accidental deaths in Minnesota
19th-century American politicians